Goyang Citizen FC was a South Korean football club based in the city of Goyang. It was founded because of the disappointment created by Goyang KB Kookmin Bank FC, which decided not to elevate to K-League after winning the Korea National League in 2006. It was a member of the K4 League, an semi-professional league and the fourth tier of league football in South Korea. In 2008, it began participating in the Korean football league setup. The club was disbanded in 2022 after it lost its K4 League license.

Former players

  Kim Dae-kwang
  Lee Kwang-Jae

Season by season records

Current squad

External links
 Goyang Citizen FC facebook
 Goyang Citizen FC Daum cafe

K3 League clubs
K4 League clubs
Sport in Goyang
2008 establishments in South Korea
Association football clubs established in 2008
Association football clubs disestablished in 2022
2022 disestablishments in South Korea